Sarah Ruth Bullock (born 17 March 1964) is a British Church of England bishop. Since 2019, she has served as Bishop of Shrewsbury, an area bishop in the Diocese of Lichfield. She was previously Archdeacon of York since 2013.

Early life and education
Bullock was born on 17 March 1964. She studied English at the University of Surrey, graduating with a Bachelor of Arts (BA) degree in 1986. She then worked as a teacher at Cheadle Hulme School, a private school in Manchester, from 1986 to 1990. During this time, she was also an assistant diocesan youth officer.

In 1990, Bullock matriculated into Cranmer Hall, Durham to train for ordination. During this time, she also studied theology at Durham University, where she was a member of St John's College, graduating with a further BA in 1993. She would later complete a postgraduate certificate in theology, also from Durham, in 2012.

Ordained ministry
Bullock was ordained in the Church of England: made a deacon at Petertide 1993 (27 June), by Christopher Mayfield, Bishop of Manchester, at Manchester Cathedral, and ordained priest the Petertide following (25 June 1994) by Colin Scott, Bishop of Hulme, at St Clement's, Urmston.

From 1993 to 1998, she served her curacy at St Paul's Church, Kersal Moor, in the Diocese of Manchester. After this she was Vocations Advisor for the Diocese of Manchester from 1998 to 2004, during which time she also served a parish in Moss Side.  She was the Rector of Whalley Range from 2004 to 2013. She was Archdeacon of York from 2013 until her elevation to the Episcopate.

She was consecrated a bishop on 3 July 2019, by Justin Welby, Archbishop of Canterbury, during a service at St Paul's Cathedral. A service of welcome was held at Shrewsbury Abbey on 13 July 2019.

Personal life
In 1992, she married Peter Bullock. Together they have one son.

References

1964 births
Living people
Alumni of the University of Surrey
Alumni of Durham University
Archdeacons of York
Anglican bishops of Shrewsbury
Women Anglican bishops
21st-century Church of England bishops
People from Whalley Range